Bouillon is a Haitian soup. This name comes from the French verb bouillir, meaning to boil. It is made with sliced meat, potatoes, sliced plantains, yam, spinach, watercress, cabbage, and celery (other ingredient variations exist), and cooked as a mildly thick soup.

See also

 List of soups

References

Haitian soups
Caribbean cuisine
Stock (food)